is a 1986 Japanese film written and directed by Kaneto Shindo. It is a drama about school bullying.

Plot

Takeshi Yasui, a junior high school student, is found dead in the river. The police investigate it as a murder related to bullying. The dead boy turns out to have been murdered by two of his schoolmates, who he had been bullying.

Cast

Terutake Tsuji as Takeshi Yasui
Ichiro Zaitsu as the school principal
Nobuko Otowa as Yasui's mother
Taiji Tonoyama as the bird watcher

External links

1986 films
Films directed by Kaneto Shindo
1980s Japanese films